A rudder angle indicator is a  device used to indicate the present position of the rudder blade, usually fitted near the Ship's wheel on the bridge and in the engine control room.

See also 
 Ship's wheel

References

Measuring instruments

Navigational equipment

Watercraft components